Alison Rice is a British travel journalist and campaigner for sustainable tourism.

She first came to prominence as editor of Ms London, a popular free magazine circulated in the Greater London area.

In the late 1970s, Alison decided to specialise in travel and was appointed travel editor of TV-am. Later, she oversaw UK satellite BSkyB's The Travel Channel. Her career included producing and presenting television and radio travel series for Richard and Judy, Daytime Live, Radio 2’s Jimmy Young Show and Michael Parkinson’s Sunday Supplement. She has written major award-winning series critically examining the sustainability of tourism for The Observer, consumer issues for the Daily Mail and travel destination features for most of the British national newspapers. She also edited the monthly magazine BBC Holidays.

Currently, Rice comments on tourism and the holiday industry for BBC Breakfast News, Sky News, Radio 5 Live and Radio 4. She also assists Visit Britain.

References

Living people
British women journalists
Year of birth missing (living people)